Han Yong-duk (born June 2, 1965) is a South Korean former professional baseball player and former manager of the Hanwha Eagles of the KBO League. Han was signed to a three-year contract in October 2017 to become Eagle's 11th manager. On June 7, 2020, he resigned from his position after the Eagles' 14th consecutive loss of the season to tie the franchise's longest losing streak.

References

External links
Career statistics and player information from the KBO League

Hanwha Eagles managers
Doosan Bears coaches
Hanwha Eagles players
South Korean baseball players
KBO League pitchers
Sportspeople from Daegu
1965 births
Living people